Streptoprocne is a genus of swifts in the family Apodidae. It contains five species that exist in Central and South America.

Species
 Biscutate swift (Streptoprocne biscutata)
 Tepui swift (Streptoprocne phelpsi)
 White-naped swift (Streptoprocne semicollaris)
 White-collared swift (Streptoprocne zonaris)
 Chestnut-collared swift (Streptoprocne rutila)

References

 
Bird genera
Taxa named by Harry C. Oberholser
Taxonomy articles created by Polbot